Delias dixeyi is a butterfly in the family Pieridae. It was described by George Hamilton Kenrick in 1909. It is found in New Guinea (Arfak Mountains).

The wingspan is about 42–45 mm. Adults do not have a red spot below the cell of the underside of the hindwings like most species in this species group. It can be distinguished from similar Delias bothwelli by the red subbasal spot and by a silvery white marginal border from the costa to cellule 3.

References

External links
Delias at Markku Savela's Lepidoptera and Some Other Life Forms

dixeyi
Butterflies described in 1909